Adelardo Rodríguez Sánchez, usually referred to simply as Adelardo (born 26 September 1939, in Badajoz), is a Spanish former professional footballer.

Club career
Adelardo enjoyed a 17-year spell at Atletico Madrid from 1959 to 1976. He was one of the most accomplished midfield schemers of his generation, combining skill, commitment and an eye for goal.

During his spell, the club won three La Liga titles (65–66, 69–70 and 72–73), five Copa del Reys (1960, 1961, 1965, 1972 and 1976), the 1962 European Cup Winners' Cup, the 1974 Intercontinental Cup.

He played for Atletico on 553 official appearances, in which he scored 113 goals. He is the second-most capped player in Atlético Madrid history, behind Koke.

International career
He played 14 times for the Spain national football team, scoring 2 goals. He was in the squad of both the 1962 FIFA World Cup and the 1966 FIFA World Cup.

International goals

Honours

Club
Atlético Madrid
Intercontinental Cup: 1974
UEFA Cup Winners' Cup: 1961–62
La Liga: 1965–66, 1969–70, 1972–73
Copa del Rey: 1959–60, 1960–61, 1964–65, 1971–72, 1975–76
Individual
: 1962

See also
 List of Atlético Madrid players (+100)
 List of La Liga players (400+ appearances)

References

External links
 
 National team data at BDFutbol
 
 

1939 births
Living people
Sportspeople from Badajoz
Footballers from Extremadura
Spanish footballers
Association football midfielders
La Liga players
Segunda División players
CD Badajoz players
Atlético Madrid footballers
Spanish men's futsal players
Inter FS players
Spain under-21 international footballers
Spain B international footballers
Spain international footballers
1962 FIFA World Cup players
1966 FIFA World Cup players